Wellington  was a federal electoral district in Ontario, Canada, that was represented in the House of Commons of Canada from 1968 to 1979.

This riding was created in 1968 from parts of Wellington South and Wentworth ridings. It consisted of the City of Guelph and the Townships of Eramosa, Guelph and Puslinch in the County of Wellington; and the Township of Beverly in the County of Wentworth. It was abolished in 1979 when it was merged into Guelph riding.

Members of Parliament

Election results

See also 

 List of Canadian federal electoral districts
 Past Canadian electoral districts

External links
Riding history from the Library of Parliament

Former federal electoral districts of Ontario